The short-tailed pygmy tyrant (Myiornis ecaudatus) is a small species of tyrant-flycatcher. The species is one of the smallest birds on Earth and the smallest passerine. Among both the family and the order, only the closely related black-capped pygmy tyrant approaches similarly diminutive sizes. The pygmy tyrant is widespread throughout most of the Amazon in northern and central South America.

Habitat
A resident of tall humid forests, the bird is occasionally found in more open woodland, specifically around treefalls and tall trees in clearings. It is fairly common throughout most of its range, but is easily overlooked, in part due to its insect- or frog-like voice.

Description
The short-tailed pygmy tyrant is truly a pygmy of a bird, with only a handful of the smallest hummingbirds measuring smaller. While the bill (though slender) is disproportionately large for the size of the bird, the tail is practically non-existent. The head is gray with blackish lores and stand-out white "spectacles". The back is bright olive-green, and the bar-less wings and tail are both black. The underside is yellow-tinged white, with light olive smudges on the chest and flanks, and the inner flight feathers are edged with yellow. The sexes are similar. Although its plumage is similar to some other tyrant flycatchers, especially the slaty-headed tody-flycatcher, in the field, the bird is more often mistaken for a large beetle or insect, especially while in flight.

Calls
Its song is a high pitched series of up to 15 c'r'eek notes, at first hesitant, then accelerating and descending slightly. There is also a cr'e'e'e', k'e'e'e'e song that is repeated over and over. Chirp-like squeaks similar to that of a well-rosined bird squeaker and a soft, purring series of trilled notes, lower in pitch than other calls, are heard. In general, the vocalizations of the short-tailed pygmy tyrant are all unlikely to be recognized as bird vocalizations, but are rather more like the sounds made by crickets or small frogs.

Behaviour
The nest, a moss and fiber ball with a side entrance, is large for the size of the bird. It may be found from  up in the tree, and never near the canopy. 2 eggs, white overlaid with brownish or cinnamon spots, are laid.

The short-tailed pygmy tyrant prefers to take prey by hover-gleaning from beneath leaves at mid-level in the forest. Its flight movements have a mechanical-feel that enhances the insect comparison. The abrupt movements of this dwarf make it hard to follow even if it is seen. This bird also occasionally flycatches after remaining very quiet.

References

Hilty, Birds of Venezuela, Second Edition,

External links

short-tailed pygmy tyrant
Birds of Colombia
Birds of Venezuela
Birds of Trinidad and Tobago
Birds of the Guianas
Birds of the Amazon Basin
short-tailed pygmy tyrant
Birds of Brazil